Cynaeda superba is a species of moth in the family Crambidae. It is found in the Republic of Macedonia.

The wingspan is about 23 mm.

References

Moths described in 1845
Odontiini